The Fleetwood branch line is a railway line that ran from  to . It passed through many smaller stations along the way, most of which are now closed. When work at Fleetwood docks was under threat in the mid-1960s, the main Fleetwood station was closed, and the remainder of the branch south to Poulton followed in 1970. There are proposals to re-open the branch to passenger services in the near future.

History 

The line was first opened in 1840. In 1966,  station was closed, and  station became the terminus. The line continued as a freight route to access the ICI plant at  until 1999, when all traffic on the line ceased.

Current situation 

Some of the line is now cleared of overgrowth because the northern track was not lifted from past  to just beyond Jameson Road Fleetwood. However, the road bridge was filled in below it. The junction, last used when goods trains took coal to Fleetwood Power Station, still exists. Looking over the road bridge on Jameson Road, the track to both north & south can still be seen through the undergrowth. In the 1990s, the new A585 The Amounderness Way bypass has been  built on the former trackbed, although sufficient space still exists for a reinstated railway should it be required.

Future of the branch 
In its 2009 Connecting Communities report, the Association of Train Operating Companies supported the re-opening of the branch line to Fleetwood, and Lancashire County Council's (LCC) Rail Improvement Schemes draft report in March 2010 stated that the case for re-opening was "compelling". Network Rail stated that a feasibility study had to take place first, which would cost around £30,000. As well as re-opening the branch, it is likely that a third platform would also be constructed at Poulton-le-Fylde.

During the 2019 general election campaign, Prime Minister Boris Johnson pledged to reopen the line.

The cost of re-opening the branch is estimated at £5.5 million as the northern track is still in situ to just past Jameson Road, Fleetwood. In January 2020, the government announced funding of £100,000 for a feasibility study of the route.

As part of the Preston to Blackpool Electrification there is passive provision for reinstatement of the line to Burn Naze and Fleetwood.

In January 2019, the line was identified by Campaign for Better Transport as a priority 1 candidate for reopening.

Preservation 
The Poulton & Wyre Railway Society is a local organisation campaigning for the line to be re-instated and have taken a three-year lease on  station. LCC seeks to support the society to help to deliver the scheme.

See also 
 Blackpool branch lines
 Preston and Wyre Joint Railway

References

External links
 Poulton and Wyre Railway Society Poulton and Wyre Railway Society are working towards restoring passenger services to Fleetwood.

Rail transport in Lancashire
Borough of Wyre
Closed railway lines in North West England
Transport in the City of Preston